Time in Washington may refer to:

 Time in Washington (state)
 Time in Washington, D.C.